The 1955 24 Hours of Le Mans was the 23rd 24 Hours of Le Mans and took place on 11 and 12 June 1955 on Circuit de la Sarthe. It was also the fourth round of the F.I.A. World Sports Car Championship. During the race, Pierre Levegh crashed into a crowd of spectators, killing 84 (including himself) and injuring 120 in the deadliest accident in motor racing history.

Regulations
The Automobile Club de l'Ouest (ACO) again lifted the replenishment window (just changed the year before) of fuel, oil and water from 30 to 32 laps (just over 430 km), but by the same token, the maximum fuel allowance for all cars was increased to 200 litres for the race.
 
On the track, road improvements continued with the whole back section, from Tertre Rouge around to Maison Blanche resurfaced.

Entries
A total of 87 racing cars were registered for this event, of which 70 arrived for practice, to qualify for the 60 places on the starting grid, and included 15 factory teams.

The battle between Coventry and Maranello of the previous year was joined by Mercedes-Benz, fresh from a triumphant debut in the Mille Miglia with their new 300SLR, along with dark horses Cunningham, Aston Martin and Maserati, all with new 3-litre cars, as well as Talbot, Gordini, Cooper, and Austin-Healey. It led observers to anticipate a great contest.

The works team mixed its current F1 drivers along with new talent: Eugenio Castellotti with Paolo Marzotto, Maurice Trintignant with Harry Schell and Umberto Maglioli drove with Phil Hill. Maglioli and Hill had been Ferrari rivals in the previous Carrera Panamericana. There were also two 3-litre 750 Monzas run by French private entries.

Having conquered Formula 1, Mercedes-Benz had now turned its attention to sports car racing. Their 300SLRs were rated by many experts as the best sports cars in the world. The fuel-injected 3-litre straight-8 was the most advanced of the entire field, producing . The inboard drum brakes, however, were only questionably adequate for the heavier chassis, facing the tough braking demands of Le Mans. To compensate, a hand-operated air brake was added to the rear deck for high speed braking. Team manager Alfred Neubauer, in a remarkably diplomatic move (recalling the war had only ended 10 years earlier), assembled a multi-national team for the race, pairing his two best drivers Juan Manuel Fangio and Stirling Moss in the lead car, 1952 race-winner Karl Kling with Frenchman André Simon (both also in the current F1 team) and American John Fitch with one of the elder statesmen of French motor-racing, Pierre Levegh. (Belgian racing-journalist Paul Frère had originally been approached but signed to drive for Aston Martin, instead.)

Jaguar arrived with three works D-types. The team consisted of 1953 winners Tony Rolt and Duncan Hamilton; up-and-coming English star Mike Hawthorn (stolen from Ferrari) paired with rookie Ivor Bueb; and Jaguar test driver Norman Dewis sharing the third car with Don Beauman. They were backed up by D-Types entered by Belgium's Ecurie Francorchamps and from American Briggs Cunningham's team.

Cunningham hedged his bets this year – along with the Jaguar he loaned 750 Monzas to French privateer Michel Pobejersky (racing as "Mike Sparken") and American Masten Gregory. He also brought (for the last time, as it happened) a new Cunningham C6-R, giving up on a big V8 Hemi to instead use an Indianapolis-style Offenhauser 3.0L straight-4. He and Sherwood Johnston would race it.

The Maserati team did make it this year – with a pair of their elegant new 3.0L 300Ss, which had already shown promise at Sebring. They were run by the team's regular F1 drivers, one shared by Roberto Mieres and Cesare Perdisa, the other by Luigi Musso and endurance racing veteran Luigi "Gino" Valenzano. Maserati also ran a smaller A6GCS in the S-2000 class.

Louis Rosier's privateer Talbot did not make the start, so the large-engined French challenge this year came from Gordini with a 3-litre T24S for F1 drivers Jean Behra and Élie Bayol. Like Maserati, they also ran a smaller T20S in the S-2000 class.

There was great interest for British fans, aside from the Jaguar team. In total there were 27 British cars starting, nearly half the field.  Aston Martin pared back its effort a bit, to just three DB3S (now with disc brakes and an improved  3-litre engine). They came with a good driver line-up: Peter Collins and Paul Frère, 1951 winner Peter Walker and Roy Salvadori, and rookies Tony Brooks and John Riseley-Prichard. They also persisted with the Lagonda project – the 4.5L V12 being biggest engine in the field. This year Reg Parnell was co-driven by Dennis Poore.

After boycotting the previous year's race, Austin-Healey returned with a single 100S prototype. Cooper brought two cars – one a Jaguar-engined T38, the other, a T39, with a Climax engine. In the S-2000 class, along with a pair each of Triumph TR2s and Frazer Nash Sebrings, Bristol was back, this time with its 450C open-top variant. To save pit-time, the team also pioneered a multi-barrel spanner to remove and re-apply all the wheelnuts together when changing the wheel. MG returned after 20 years with the EX.182 prototype – a 1.5L forerunner of the upcoming MGA roadster. Colin Chapman, racing with Scotsman Ron Flockhart arrived with his new Lotus 9 sports car – like the other small English firms Kieft, Cooper and Arnott, running the 1100cc Climax engine.

After a fortuitous class victory in 1954, Porsche arrived in force with a mix of works and (nominally) private entries: four cars in the S-1500 and two in the S-1100 classes. In contrast, after the despair of their 1954 race, OSCA only had a single privateer in the S-1500 class.

The smallest, S-750, class was again dominated by French cars, from Panhard, Monopole, DB (all with Panhard engines), and VP-Renault. Panhard also fielded two bigger, 850cc-engined, cars that had to run in the S-1100 class. However several Italian teams arrived to take on the French with entries from Moretti and Stanguellini. Perhaps the most unusual entry was the tiny catamaran-style Damolnar Bisiluro from Ufficine Nardi – where the driver sat in one boom and the engine and running gear was in the other.

Practice
As expected, the Ferraris showed themselves to be extremely fast on a single lap, and Castellotti set the fastest official time, easily breaking the lap record and was a second quicker than Fangio in his Mercedes. But there were also a number of serious accidents during practice: Moss was leaving the pits just as the DB-Panhard of Claude Storez came in, the small car hit Jean Behra. While both cars were able to start the race, Behra had face and leg injuries that forced him out, to be replaced by reserve driver Robert Manzon. Coming into Maison Blanche,  Behra's erstwhile teammate Élie Bayol in the new Gordini T24S came upon two spectators crossing the track. He swerved and rolled the car and was taken to hospital with a fractured skull and broken vertebrae; Peter Taylor was also severely injured when he crashed the new Arnott. Levegh came in after a close brush with a Gordini, commenting "We have to get some sort of signal system working. Our cars go too fast". Neubauer tried, unsuccessfully, to persuade the ACO to allow him to erect a small signalling tower at the top of pit-line for his team.

As a comparison, some of the lap-times recorded during practice were:

Over the flying kilometre on the Mulsanne straight, the following top speeds in practice and the race were recorded:

Race

Start
This year the honorary starter was Conte Aymo Maggi, the President and organiser of the Mille Miglia. Giovanni Moretti's two cars arrived on the start grid a few minutes after the 2pm deadline and were excluded from starting.
It was Castellotti, by dint of being near the front of the grid formation, who was first under the Dunlop Bridge and leading the first lap, followed by Hawthorn in the Jaguar.  Fangio's start was delayed when his trouser leg snagged on the gear shift lever, but he worked his way up the field to join Hawthorn and Castellotti. The crowd's expectations of a showdown between the three top marques were soon fulfilled as, by lap 4, the three manufacturers’ works cars filled the top 8 places – excepting Trintignant's Ferrari in the pits with an early issue.  One of the first casualties was on lap 5 as the leaders started lapping the backmarkers – the tiny Nardi was literally blown off the road into a ditch by the slipstream of the bigger cars. The pace was furious but Castellotti managed to keep Hawthorn and Fangio at bay for the first hour. Behind them was Maglioli's Ferrari, the American Jaguar, the other pair of works Mercedes-Benz's and Jaguars and in 10th Mieres in the Maserati.

Finally, after 70 minutes, it was Castellotti's mistake braking for the Mulsanne corner that let the Jaguar and Mercedes through. Those two then set about pushing harder still, dropping the Ferrari and successively beating the lap record – broken ten times in the first two hours and finally claimed by Hawthorn on lap 28 – setting it over 7 seconds faster than the Ferrari's practice lap.

At 6.20pm, at the end of lap 35 when the first pit-stops were due, the 1955 Le Mans disaster occurred. Having got the order from his Jaguar crew to pit, Hawthorn braked sharply in front of Lance Macklin's Austin-Healey. Macklin then braked hard, getting off the right-hand edge of the track and throwing up dust. Macklin's car then veered back to the centre of the track, into the path of Levegh's Mercedes-Benz, which was running 6th having just gone a lap down. Travelling at 150 mph, Levegh's right-front wheel rode up onto the left rear corner of Macklin's, launching the car into the air and rolling end over end for 80 metres over spectators.

The car slammed into a four-foot earthen embankment – the only barrier between the spectators and the track - and disintegrated. The momentum of the heaviest components of the car – the engine, radiator and front suspension - carried them into the crowd for almost 100 metres. Those who had climbed onto ladders and scaffolding to get a better view of the track found themselves in the direct path of the lethal debris. The remainder of the car, on the earth bank, exploded into flames, burning with extra heat from its magnesium-alloy body. Levegh was killed instantly in the impact.

Race officials kept the race running, reasoning that if the huge crowd tried to leave en masse it would clog the roads, severely restricting access for medical and emergency crews trying to save the injured. Hawthorn, after being initially waved through his stop because of the confusion and potential danger, stopped along with the other lead cars for their scheduled pit stops and driver changes. Then thirteen minutes later, the MG of Dick Jacobs lost control exiting Maison Blanche, rolled and landed upside-down, burning. Jacobs survived the accident, but was severely injured and never raced again.
Phil Hill, now driving Maglioli's Ferrari noted "At this point I was numbed by it all, shocked that all this could be happening at once and on my first-ever Ferrari racing lap of Le Mans. But then Stirling Moss went by me like a streak in his Mercedes 300 SLR, and that woke me up. That was a lesson I never forgot, which was that when something happens, get on the gas."

His teammates, Castellotti and Marzotto, were the first of the leaders to falter: a slipping clutch eventually led to engine failure just before 8pm. Maglioli and Hill took up their third place until they too were stopped about 11pm when a rock pierced their radiator.

Night
With the driver changes from Hawthorn to Bueb and Fangio to Moss, the Jaguar team's talent was outmatched and the Mercedes team was able to extend its lead.  At midnight, the Mercedes of Fangio/Moss was leading Hawthorn/Bueb by two laps, themselves two laps ahead of the Kling/Simon Mercedes and the other two works Jaguars all scrapping between themselves. Further back were Musso's Maserati, Collins’ Aston Martin, the Belgian Jaguar and the remaining big Ferrari fighting its way up from the back of the field. 
The race remained competitive, however with Hawthorn behind the wheel, as the lead was whittled down to 1½ laps by 2am.  The other Mercedes still trailed the Hawthorn/Bueb car by two laps.  Race spotters' reports on the Mercedes' braking points led the Jaguar team to believe that their brakes were weakening.

After the catastrophic accident, John Fitch, picking up on the early media reports, had urged the Mercedes team to withdraw from the race – he could see that win or lose, it would be a PR disaster for the company. Mercedes team manager Alfred Neubauer had already reached the same conclusion but did not have the authority to make such a decision. After an emergency meeting of the company directors in Stuttgart, Neubauer finally got the call approving the team's withdrawal just before midnight. Waiting until 1.45am, when many spectators had left, he stepped onto the track and quietly called his cars into the pits, at the time running 1st and 3rd. The public address made a brief announcement regarding their retirement. Chief engineer Rudolf Uhlenhaut went to the Jaguar pits to ask if the Jaguar team would respond in kind, out of respect for the accident's victims.  Jaguar team manager Lofty England declined.

Meanwhile, Don Beauman had planted his works Jaguar in the sandtrap at Arnage. Having taken over an hour to dig it out, he had just got it free after 10 pm when Colin Chapman came off at Arnage and smacked the Jaguar. Chapman quickly reversed and got going again only to be disqualified because he had restarted without the marshal's permission

The Aston Martins had been running to a strict lap-time set by team manager John Wyer, but keeping just in the top-10. Either side of midnight two of them were sidelined by mechanical issues. They followed their sister-Lagonda that had run out of fuel from a loose-fitting filler-cap.

Soon after the Mercedes-Benz team withdrawal, the last Ferrari (that of Trintignant / Schell) retired with engine trouble, having fought back up to 10th position. With no further challenge from Mercedes-Benz or Ferrari, Jaguar were holding a comfortable 1–2, although Rolt and Hamilton were having problems with their gearbox.

In the 2-litre category, the Maserati and Gordini had been battling each other, well ahead of the British cars and just outside the top-10. The Gordini was delayed by a defective battery, but the Maserati then retired just after midnight with ignition failure. Even at this stage though, the two works 1500cc Porsches were ahead of these bigger cars. Further back, third in class, was the Belgian-entered Porsche (giving a first Le Mans drive to future endurance great Olivier Gendebien)

Morning
Dawn broke under a heavy, overcast sky and by 6am it had started to rain.  Soon after, the class-leading Gordini pitted with a holed-radiator just two laps before its replenishment window. Trying to inch its way round the circuit it over-heated and had to retire. The S-2000 class fell into the lap of the Bristols. Around 8am, the second Jaguar's gearbox finally seized and they were out. With gloomy weather and little enthusiasm now for the race, the running order saw few changes. Second place remained in contention until late morning as the Valenzano/Musso Maserati, five laps down from the leader, was pushing hard and being chased by the Collins/Frère Aston Martin until the Maserati retired with a seized transmission.  About the same time the Cunningham also retired: never in the running, lapping in 13th behind the smaller Porsches and Bristols, it had lost its lower gears the night before.

A special mass was held in the morning in the Le Mans Cathedral for the first funerals of the accident victims.

Finish

The race finished in drizzle. Bueb, in his first event for the Coventry marque, handed over the leading Jaguar to Hawthorn for the final 15 minutes, and they coasted to a comfortable victory, completing a record-breaking 306 laps and finishing five laps ahead of the Aston Martin (achieving their best result to date, and only finish since 1951). The podium was completed by the Belgian pair of Johnny Claes and Jacques Swaters, in their yellow Ecurie Francorchamps Jaguar D-Type. Although 11 laps (nearly 150 km) behind the winners, they were again a model of reliability.

Porsche had its best finish yet with the trio of 1.5 litre Porsche 550 Spyders finishing fourth, fifth and sixth with Helmut Polensky and Richard von Frankenberg winning the S-1500 class, the Index of Performance, as well as the Biennial Cup. The Belgian Porsche had moved up the order late in the race to split the two works cars. Additionally the privateer Porsche comprehensively won the S-1100 class finishing nearly 40 laps ahead of the unclassified Cooper. The three-car Bristol team finished seventh, eighth and ninth, in formation for a consecutive year at the top of two-litre class. Managing director Sir George White donated the team's winnings to a charity for the disaster's victims. After their debacle of the previous year's race, the only Italian car to finish this year was the 1.5L OSCA. Two of the DB-Panhards were the only French cars to finish in the normally reliable small-car classes.
For the first time none of the Cunningham team cars finished.

Despite the disaster and poor weather, there were a number of new records set: Both first and second beat the old distance record – and five new class records were set. In fact, the two leading 1.5L Porsches both went further than the overall distance covered by the 1952-winning Mercedes-Benz. The opening hours had also seen the lap record broken by a significant margin.

Post-race and aftermath

The catastrophic crash, which came to be known as the 1955 Le Mans disaster, remains the deadliest accident in the history of motorsport. The actual death toll is uncertain, put at from 80 to 84, including Levegh, with many more than that number severely injured.  Spurring mentions that the official report cites "Levegh" and 80 spectators were killed and 178 were injured.

The next round of the World Sports Car Championship at the Nürburgring was cancelled, as was the Carrera Panamericana.  The accident caused widespread shock and immediate bans on auto racing in many countries.  A number of racing teams including Mercedes-Benz, MG and Bristol had disbanded and withdrawn from racing by the end of the season.  The scale of the accident caused some drivers present, including Phil Walters (who had been offered a drive with Ferrari for the rest of the season), Sherwood Johnston, and John Fitch (after completing the season with Mercedes-Benz), to retire from racing. Fitch was coaxed out of retirement by his friend Briggs Cunningham to help the Chevrolet Corvette effort at Le Mans in 1960 and later worked to develop traffic safety devices including the sand-filled "Fitch barrels". Less than three months later, Lance Macklin decided to retire after being involved in a twin fatality accident during the 1955 RAC Tourist Trophy race at Dundrod Circuit. Juan Manuel Fangio never raced at Le Mans again.
 
Although Hawthorn was relieved to have gotten his first Le Mans victory, he was devastated by the tragedy. A press photo showed him smiling on the podium swigging from the victor's bottle of champagne, and the French press ran it with the sarcastic headline "Here's to You, Mr Hawthorn".

The official enquiry concluded that no one driver was to blame and that it was instead a tragic combination of circumstances that had caused the accident, including serious deficiencies in the track design and safety.

A few days after the race, a full ban on motor racing events was put into effect by the French government, pending the creation of new rules to ensure the safety of the sport. This complete ban was lifted on September 14, 1955. At this time, the Ministry of the Interior released new regulations for racing events, and codified the approval process that future racing events would need to follow. On the same day, the ACO announced their intent to hold the Le Mans race in 1956, and to make modifications to the Circuit de la Sarthe as necessary to adhere to the Ministry's new regulations. Before the 1956 event, the grandstands and pits were demolished, as well as straightening and widening the track at and approaching the pits, and realigning Dunlop Curve. They increased the separation between the road and the spectators including a wide ditch, and revised other hazardous stretches of the track. Track safety technology and practices evolved slowly until Formula 1 driver Jackie Stewart organized a concerted campaign to advocate for better safety measures 10 years later.  Stewart's campaign gained momentum after the deaths of Lorenzo Bandini and Jim Clark.

Official results
Results taken from Quentin Spurring's book, officially licensed by the ACO. Class Winners are in bold text.

Note *: Not Classified because of Insufficient distance, as car failed to cover 70% of its class-winner's distance.

Did not finish

Did not start

Index of performance

Only the top ten positions are included in this set of standings. A score of 1.00 means meeting the minimum distance for the car, and a higher score is exceeding the nominal target distance.

21st Rudge-Whitworth Biennial Cup (1954/1955)

Statistics

Taken from Quentin Spurring's book, officially licensed by the ACO

 Fastest lap in practice –  Castelloti, #4 Ferrari 735 LM – 4m 14.0s; 191.14 kp/h (118.77 mph)
 Fastest lap – Hawthorn, #6 Jaguar D-Type – 4m 06.6s; 196.96 kp/h (122.39 mph)
 Fastest car in speedtrap –  Fangio, #19 Mercedes-Benz 300 SLR – 292.21 kp/h (181.57 mph)
 Distance – 4135.38  km (2569.73 miles)
 Winner's average speed – 172.31 km/h (107.07 mph)
 Attendance –  about 400,000

World Championship standings after the race

Championship points were awarded for the first six places in each race in the order of 8-6-4-3-2-1. Manufacturers were only awarded points for their highest finishing car, with no points awarded for positions filled by additional cars.

Citations

References
 Spurring, Quentin (2011)    Le Mans 1949-59    Sherborne, Dorset: Evro Publishing  
 Anderson, Gary G. (2000)   Austin-Healey 100, 100–6, 3000 Restoration Guide    MotorBooks International    
 Cannell, Michael (2011)    The Limit    London: Atlantic Books  
 Clarke, R.M. - editor (1997)    Le Mans 'The Jaguar Years 1949-1957'    Cobham, Surrey: Brooklands Books  
 Clausager, Anders (1982)    Le Mans    London: Arthur Barker Ltd  
 Foster, Frank (2013)    F1: A History of Formula One Racing    BookCaps Study Guides  
 Hill, Phil (2004)    Ferrari, a Champion's view    Deerfield: Dalton Watson   
 Laban, Brian (2001)    Le Mans 24 Hours    London: Virgin Books   
 Moity, Christian (1974)    The Le Mans 24 Hour Race 1949-1973    Radnor, Pennsylvania: Chilton Book Co  
 Pomeroy, L. & Walkerley, R. - editors (1956)    The Motor Year Book 1956    Bath: The Pitman Press
 Whitaker, Sigur E. (2014)   Tony Hulman: The Man Who Saved the Indianapolis Motor Speedway    McFarland

External links
  Racing Sports Cars website – Le Mans 24 Hours 1955 entries, results, technical detail. Retrieved 10 December 2016.
  Le Mans History website – Le Mans History, hour-by-hour (incl. pictures, YouTube links). Retrieved 10 December 2016.
  Formula 2 website –  Le Mans results & reserve entries. Retrieved 10 December 2016.
  World Sportscar Championship website – Le Mans results & reserve entries. Retrieved 10 December 2016.
  Team Dan website –  Le Mans results & reserve entries. Retrieved 10 December 2016.
 Le Mans 1955 from The Mike Hawthorn Tribute Site – Extensive 1955 Le Mans coverage – reports, analysis, photos/video of race & crash. Retrieved 10 December 2016
 The Deadliest Crash –  George Pollen's 2009 1hr documentary analysing the race and the accident, interviewing drivers and witnesses. Retrieved 10 December 2016
  Video of accident and aftermath. Retrieved 10 December 2016
  YouTube –  ‘British Pathé’ colour film (no sound) of the race  (8mins). Retrieved 10 December 2016

Le Mans
24 Hours of Le Mans races
1955 in French motorsport
June 1955 sports events in Europe